Nyaunglebin Township is a township situated in Bago District, Bago Region of Myanmar.

References

Townships of the Bago Region
Bago District